Madison Campbell (born 12 August 1995) is a New Zealand professional racing cyclist who rides for Servetto Footon.

See also
 List of 2016 UCI Women's Teams and riders

References

External links
 

1995 births
Living people
New Zealand female cyclists
Place of birth missing (living people)